Crossover may refer to:

Entertainment

Albums and songs
 Cross Over (Dan Peek album)
 Crossover (Dirty Rotten Imbeciles album), 1987
 Crossover (Intrigue album)
 Crossover (Hitomi Shimatani album)
 Crossover (Yoshinori Sunahara album), 1995
 "Cross Over" (song), a 2013 single by the Japanese girl idol group 9nine
 "Crossover" (song), by EPMD

Comics
 Cross Over (manga), by Kouji Seo
 Crossover (storyline), a 2005 Fantastic Four storyline
 The Crossovers, a 2003 CrossGen comic book series
 Crossover (Image Comics), a 2020 comic book series

Film and television
 Crossover (1980 film), a 1980 film
 Crossover (2006 film), a 2006 basketball drama by Preston A. Whitmore II
 "Crossover" (Adventure Time), a 2016 episode of the animated series Adventure Time
 "Crossover" (Star Trek: Deep Space Nine), a 1994 episode of Star Trek: Deep Space Nine

Other entertainment
 Crossover (fiction), a storyline combining characters or settings from separate fictional properties
 Intercompany crossover, a comic or series of comics where characters that at the time of publication are the property of one company meet those owned by another company
 Crossover music, a performer or work that finds success in multiple genres
 Crossover (theater), a passage for actors to move across a stage without being seen by the audience
 Crossover thrash, a musical genre combining thrash metal and hardcore punk
 Crossover (video games)
 Crossovers (dance), moves from the dance Balboa
 The Crossover, a 2014 book by Kwame Alexander

Science
 Crossover (genetic algorithm), a genetic operator that varies a chromosome's programming between generations
 Crossover experiment (chemistry), a method for studying the mechanism of chemical reactions
 Crossover, a generic term for a smooth phase transition in physics
 Crossover study, a type experimental design in a clinical trial
 Crossover distortion, a type of electronic distortion
 Chromosomal crossover, an exchange of genetic material between homologous chromosomes
 Mitotic crossover, a type of genetic recombination

Sports
 Crossover (figure skating), a technique for gaining impetus while skating along a curve
 Crossover (football trick)
 Crossover dribble, a basketball move
 Colorado Crossover, a basketball team
 Fayetteville Crossover, a semi-professional basketball team in Fayetteville, North Carolina

Technology
 Audio crossover, a type of electronic filter circuitry used to divide an audio signal into two or more frequency ranges
 CrossOver (software), Windows compatibility layer software
 Crossover cable, crossover cables in general
 Crossover switch, a switch connecting multiple inputs to multiple outputs
 Ethernet crossover cable, a cable for directly connecting two pieces of equipment

Transportation
 Crossover (automobile), a sport utility vehicle built on a car platform
 Crossover (rail), a configuration of railway track
 EuroSport Crossover, an electric glider and ultralight aircraft

Other
 105.1 Crossover, a Philippines music radio station
 Crossover effects, a concept in linguistics concerning interactions between words
 Crossover, a piece of dog agility equipment